Spragg is a surname. People with that name include:

 Edward Spragge (AKA Spragg or Sprague, 162073), Irish admiral of the Royal Navy
 Laura Spragg (born 1982), English international cricketer
 Lonnie Spragg (18791904), Australian international rugby union player
 Warren Spragg (born 1982), English-born Italian international rugby union player
 Wesley Spragg (18481930), English-born New Zealand butter manufacturer and exporter, temperance campaigner, and benefactor

See also 
 Sprag clutch, a one-way freewheel clutch
 Spragg bag, a flexible barge for the transportation of bulk fresh water or other liquid bulk items
 Spragge (disambiguation)
 Sprague (disambiguation)